Loughton is an ancient village and modern district in the civil parish of Loughton and Great Holm in Milton Keynes, Buckinghamshire, England. The village spreads between Watling Street and the modern A5 road, to the west of, and about 1 mile from, Central Milton Keynes.

Historic Loughton
The village name is an Old English language word, and means 'Luhha's estate'. In the Domesday Book of 1086 the village was recorded as Lochintone. All Saints Church is the oldest surviving building in Loughtonthe chancel and nave probably date from the first years of the 13th century, though all the original details have been removed during subsequent alterations.

Modern Loughton district
The original village has now been incorporated into the modern 'grid square' of Loughton. However much of the character of the old village remains; to the north-east of Bradwell Road the area bounded by School Lane and Church Lane contains the Church and remnants of the original parish of Great Loughton. To the south-west of Bradwell Road, around The Green there is a cluster of several sixteenth century buildings (Manor Farm, Manor Farm Cottages and Cell Farm) which constitute the remains of the original parish of Little Loughton.

Today Loughton is a mainly residential area but is also home to a large Equestrian Centre, in the grounds of which the medieval field pattern and fish pond can still be seen.

The district is bounded by the A5 to the east, H5 Portway to the north, V4 Watling Street to the west and H6 Childs Way to the south.

Pronunciation

References

External links
Archival photos and recorded interviews with long-term residents of Loughton are available in 'Living Memories of London Road' and 'The Story of Loughton National School'

Villages in Buckinghamshire
Areas of Milton Keynes